Tamaz Giviyevich Kostava (born 29 February 1956, in Kutaisi) is a retired Georgian football player of the Soviet national team.

Honours
 Soviet Top League winner: 1978.
 Soviet Cup winner: 1979.
 UEFA Cup Winners' Cup winner: 1981

International career
Kostava made his debut for USSR on 19 November 1978 in a friendly against Japan. In fact, all of the national team games he played in were against Japan (USSR played three friendlies against them in 8 days).

References
  Profile

1956 births
Living people
Footballers from Georgia (country)
Soviet footballers
Soviet Union international footballers
FC Torpedo Kutaisi players
FC Dinamo Tbilisi players
Soviet Top League players
Sportspeople from Kutaisi
Association football defenders